Erismanthus is a plant genus of the family Euphorbiaceae first described as a genus in 1866. It is native to Southeast Asia and southern China.

Species
 Erismanthus obliquus Wall. ex Müll.Arg. - S Thailand, Malaysia, Borneo, Sumatra
 Erismanthus sinensis Oliv. - Cambodia, Laos, Thailand, Vietnam, Hainan

formerly included
Erismanthus leembruggianus Boerl. & Koord., synonym of Moultonianthus leembruggianus (Boerl. & Koord.) Steenis

References

Euphorbiaceae genera
Acalyphoideae